Le Roi Est Mort, Vive Le Roi! (French for "") is the third studio album by the German musical project Enigma, released on 22 November 1996 by Virgin Records.

The album reached to the top spot in Norway and the top five in Austria, Finland, Germany and Switzerland. It spawned two singles, "Beyond the Invisible" and "T.N.T. for the Brain". A planned third single, "The Roundabout", was scrapped at the last minute for unclear reasons, even though a remix had already been created by DJ Quicksilver.

The album continued Enigma's trend, giving it a slightly more modern, futuristic sound by combining the elements of Enigma's first album, MCMXC a.D., and their second album, The Cross of Changes. Michael Cretu, producer of the project, considered Le Roi Est Mort, Vive Le Roi! to be the child of the previous two albums, with the first being the father and the second being the mother, as indicated by the 19‑second track "Third of Its Kind".

There are two editions of the packaging; one with standard paper artwork, and another with translucent tray and booklet artwork printed on a heavier plastic.

Le Roi Est Mort, Vive Le Roi! was nominated for Best New Age Album at the 1998 Grammy Awards, while Johann Zambryski's album art design earned him a nomination for Best Recording Package.

The intro track begins with a sample of mission control contacting the Discovery from the film 2001: A Space Odyssey. The intro, including the famed "Enigma horn", is played backwards for the closing track, "Odyssey of the Mind".

The track "T.N.T. for the Brain" contains samples taken from Jeff Wayne's Musical Version of The War of the Worlds. The samples are just audible, underlying the main music. They can be most clearly heard at the start and the end of the track, but are just noticeable throughout.

Reception
{{Album ratings
| rev1 = AllMusic
| rev1score = 
| rev2 = Entertainment Weekly
| rev2score = D+
|rev3 = The Guardian
|rev3score = 
|rev4 = Muzik
|rev4Score = <ref>{{Cite magazine |last=Newsome |first=Rachel |date=January 1997 |title=Enigma: La Roi Est Mort, Vive Le Roi! |url=http://www.muzikmagazine.co.uk/issues/muzik020_january_1997.pdf |magazine=Muzik |issue=20 |page=117 |archive-url=https://web.archive.org/web/20220402181253/http://www.muzikmagazine.co.uk/issues/muzik020_january_1997.pdf |archive-date=2 April 2022 |access-date=16 July 2022}}</ref>
}}

Rick Anderson of AllMusic stated that "[Michael Cretu, as Enigma] doesn't seem to have done much to expand upon his original ideas", and despite reserving praise for the "darkly lovely" "The Child in Us", dismissed most of the album as "twaddle" and "disappointing". The site gave the album two and a half stars out of five. Tracey Pepper of Entertainment Weekly summarized the album as "another synthesizer-heavy mix of Gregorian chants, moody atmospherics, lyrics rife with existential platitudes, and well-trodden '90s dance rhythms", writing, "It sounded okay in 1990, but now it's just embarrassing."

Track listing
All lyrics and music by Michael Cretu, except where noted.

Personnel
Credits adapted from the liner notes of Le Roi Est Mort, Vive Le Roi!''

 Dr.Bhagya Murthy - Sanskrit chant
 Sandra Cretu – female voices
 Louisa Stanley – female voices
 Peter Cornelius – guitars on "The Child In Us"
 Michael Cretu – instruments, production, engineering
 Johann Zambryski – art direction, design
 Volker Sträter – illustrations

Charts

Weekly charts

Year-end charts

Certifications

References

External links
 Details about the album

1996 albums
Charisma Records albums
Enigma (German band) albums
Virgin Records albums